This page provides brief details of primary schools in the borough of Three Rivers in Hertfordshire, England, United Kingdom.

All the state-funded primary schools in Three Rivers are co-educational.
There are four Roman Catholic schools and five Church of England schools in the area, all of which are voluntary aided schools except for Sarratt Church of England School, which is voluntary controlled.
The remaining schools are all non-faith community schools.
The Local Education Authority is Hertfordshire County Council.

There are still some linked pairs of infant schools and junior schools, with the infant school covering Reception and Key Stage 1 (Years 1 and 2) and the junior school covering Key Stage 2 (Years 3 to 6).
However most have been amalgamated in a single Junior Mixed Infant (JMI) school or (equivalently) primary school.

West: Rickmansworth, Chorleywood and environs 

Rickmansworth Charity School was established in 1711.
The charity grew with a number of bequests, and the school was rebuilt on a new site in 1814.
In 1836 the Rickmansworth Poor House on the High Street (adjacent to the current Baptist church) closed, and the site was taken over by the school, now operating as a national school.
The school was extended in 1851, and closed in 1936.

Mill End National School was established in 1862, initially for girls and infants but soon also taking boys.
In 1874 the school moved to new buildings, and in 1936 became a county-funded JMI school, now known as St Peter's CofE VA Primary School.

West Hyde National School was established in 1862, enlarged in 1874 and 1901, and replaced by a county school across the road in 1914.

Chorleywood National School (now Christ Church Church of England School) was established in 1853, 8 years after Chorleywood became a separate parish.
It was joined in 1911 by Stag Lane Primary School, which was rebuilt in the 1960s as Chorleywood Primary School.

Central: Croxley Green

The original village school in Yorke Road was established in 1875.
After the building was partially destroyed by fire, Harvey Road School was hastily built to accommodate some of the students.
The village school was finally replaced by Yorke Meade School.
Malvern Way School is linked with Little Green.

North-east: Abbots Langley and Garston 

This area now comprises the northern suburbs of Watford.

Abbots Langley Primary School was founded as a national school, first for boys, with departments for girls and infants built in the 1840s.
In 1853 the boys' school was rebuilt on land left by local landowner Francis Combe, a benefactor of several schools in the area.
The boys and girls schools were amalgamated in 1923, and the schools and lands sold to Hertfordshire County Council in 1949.
The school was rebuilt on the girls' site in 1958; the boys' site is now occupied by the public library.

St Paul's C of E Primary School also started as a national school, set up by William Jones Loyd of Langleybury.
The original school house still stands across the A41 road from the church, and is Grade II listed.
The school was moved to the present site in 1967 following the widening of the A41 in the previous year.

Tanners Wood JMI School was opened in 1989 as a relaunch of Hillside JMI School, which was formed in 1982 from the merger or Hillside Junior School and Hazelwood Infants School on the site of the former junior school. The former Hazelwood site is now occupied by Breakspeare School.

South-east: Northwood, South Oxhey and Carpenders Park 

This area lies between Watford and the northern edge of Greater London.

Eastbury Farm Junior Mixed Infant and Nursery School was judged outstanding in all areas by Ofsted in 2007, a result achieved by only 1% of primary schools in England.
Eastbury Farm's Key Stage 2 pupils achieve significantly higher grades in English, Mathematics and Science than the national average.

Greenfields Primary School was the first of a new generation of school buildings in Hertfordshire, and is Grade II listed.

See also
The secondary schools in Three Rivers:
 Parmiter's School
 Rickmansworth School
 St. Clement Danes School
 St Joan of Arc Catholic School, Rickmansworth
 St. Michael's Catholic High School

The special school in Three Rivers:
 Breakspeare School

References

Three Rivers
Schools in Three Rivers District